Narayana Ghatta is a village in Anekal Taluk, Muthanallur panchayat, Sarjapura Hobli, Bangalore, India. The village has a population of around 2,500.

References 

Villages in Bangalore Urban district